Bill Briggs may refer to:

Bill Briggs (skier) (born 1931), American extreme skier and director of the Great American Ski School, Jackson, Wyoming
Bill Briggs (defensive end) (born 1943), former American football defensive end
Bill Briggs (American football coach), American football coach in the United States
Bill Briggs (Canadian football) (1925–2000), Canadian football player

See also
Billy Briggs (born 1977), American musician and songwriter
William Briggs (disambiguation)